Lahuen Ñadi Natural Monument is a  protected ñadi area in Los Lagos Region of southern Chile. It is located between Puerto Montt and Puerto Varas. Lahue Ñadi is one of the few places in the Chilean Central Valley where mature Fitzroya stands are preserved, some of them reaching ages of 1800 years.

References

Parque Lahen Ñadi

Protected areas of Los Lagos Region
Swamps of South America
Wetlands of Chile
Natural monuments of Chile
Landforms of Los Lagos Region